When the Dog Dies is a BBC Radio 4 sitcom starring Ronnie Corbett as Sandy Hopper, a retired man whose family want him to leave his house, and Liza Tarbuck as his lodger Dolores. Like the 1980s sitcom Sorry!, the show is written by Ian Davidson and Peter Vincent.

Plot 

The stories revolve around Sandy's children's attempts to get him to "downsize" or move into a retirement home (so they can sell his house and get the money) and the various relationships between his family members, Dolores, and the men in her life. Sandy refuses to go till his dog, Henry, dies.

Cast 

 Ronnie Corbett as Sandy Hopper
 Liza Tarbuck as his lodger Dolores
 Tilly Vosburgh as his daughter Ellie
 Jonathan Aris (series 1 - 3) and Dave Lamb (series 4) as Ellie's husband Blake
 Daniel Bridle as their son Tyson
 Philip Bird as Sandy's son Lance
 Grace Vance as his granddaughter Calais
 Sally Grace as Mrs Pompom (a dog walker Sandy meets, named after her dog Pom Pom)

Production 

The series is written by Ian Davidson and Peter Vincent, and produced by CPL Productions for the BBC. Four series have been broadcast, from 2010 to 2014, with repeats on BBC Radio Four Extra. The fourth series is to be the last.

Episodes 
Series 1
 The Same Hymn Sheet
 Spying is Believing
 The Rival Granddad
 Portrait of the Artist as an Old Man
 Squeaky Shoes
 Desperately Seeking Dolores

Series 2
 Catchment If You Can
 Knock Down Ginger.
 Temptation
 The Never Ending Story
 Tangled Web
 It was A Dark and Stormy Night

Series 3
 Where There's A Will
 Auntie's Ashes
 The Secret of Youth
 Full Fathom Five
 It's That Song Again
 Mammon and Other Demons

Series 4
 Gone in a Flash
 The Call of the Wild
 Ships That Pass
 The Hills Are Alive
 One Dog and his Man
 Twilight of the Gods

References

BBC Radio comedy programmes
2010 radio programme debuts